Blunted in the Bomb Shelter is a compilation album by hip hop producer Madlib. This album is a collection of reggae, ska, and dub songs taken from the catalogs of Trojan Records. Compiled around 2001 to 2002, the album was first released in the format of two 12-inch LPs and later released on CD format.

Track list
This track list is referenced from the CD format.

References

External links
 On Antidote Records website

2002 compilation albums
Madlib albums